Microneedle may refer to :

 Elements of a microneedle array/patch for transdermal drug delivery
 microneedling, a mechanical/RF skin treatment used e.g. for Collagen induction therapy
 a microinjector

See also